Aadil is a male given name. Notable people with the name include:

 Aadil Ali (born 1994), English cricket player
 Aadil Assana (born 1993), Comorian football player
 Aadil Bedi (born 2001), Indian golfer
 Aadil Manzoor Peer (born 1997), Indian ice stock sport athlete
 Aadil Rashid (born 1990), Indian cricketer
 Aadil Sheegow Sagaar, Somali politician

Masculine given names